Ardices curvata, the crimson tiger moth, is a moth of the family Erebidae. It was first described by Edward Donovan in 1805 and it is found in Australia. The species was formerly included in Spilosoma, but later generic status of Ardices was proved by Vladimir Viktorovitch Dubatolov (2005).

The larvae feed on Taraxacum officinale, Phaseolus vulgaris, Pelargonium zonale and Tropaeolum majus.

References
 (2005). "On the status of the Australian genus Ardices F. Walker, 1855 with the description of a new subgenus for A. curvata Donovan, 1805 (Lepidoptera, Arctiidae)". Atalanta. 36 (1/2): 173–179, 394-395 (colour plate 10).

External links

curvata
Moths described in 1805
Moths of Australia